The Nansen Store is an historic retail building at 43713 228th Street in rural Miner County, South Dakota, roughly  8 miles northeast of Howard.  The store is a -story wood-frame structure, with a smaller -story structure attached.  Although it is uncertain when the first structure was built, a store was on the site in 1903, with what was described as an addition (24' x 32') in 1910, and the building presently standing was fully described in a 1937 mortgage.  The larger section has a full-width front porch with a hip roof, and a center entry flanked by large four-pane display windows.  The smaller section is to the left of the larger one,  also with a gable front.  It was originally a Homestead home, probably built about 1890, since the patent for the land was 1889. The first documented operator of the store was Knut Skaar, a Norwegian immigrant.

The building was listed on the National Register of Historic Places in 2014.

References

Commercial buildings completed in 1898
Buildings and structures in Miner County, South Dakota
Commercial buildings on the National Register of Historic Places in South Dakota
National Register of Historic Places in Miner County, South Dakota